The Fussball Club Basel 1893 1982–83 season was their 89th season since the club was founded. It was their 37th consecutive season in the top flight of Swiss football after they won promotion during the season 1945–46. They played their home games in the St. Jakob Stadium. Roland Rasi was appointed as the club's chairman at the AGM, he replaced Pierre Jacques Lieblich who stood down.

Overview

Pre-season
Rainer Ohlhauser was the first team manager. He had taken over from Helmut Benthaus, who had been manager for 17 years between 1965 and 1982, and who had moved on to take over as manager of VfB Stuttgart. A number of players left the squad, Ernst Schleiffer moved on to Grenchen, Peter Marti went to Aarau, Markus Tanner to Luzern and Joseph Küttel to Lugano. In the other direction Winfried Berkemeier joined from Young Boys, Ruedi Zbinden joined from local rivals Nordstern Basel and Nicolas Keller joined from Chiasso. There were also a number of youngsters who advanced from the youth team, Roger Bossert, Guido Rudin and Thomas Hauser.

Basel played a total of 51 games this season. 30 matches were played in the domestic league, three in the Swiss Cup, four in the Cup of the Alps and 14 were friendly matches. The Swiss League Cup was no longer played this season. The team scored a total of 108 goals and conceded 85. Of their 14 test games, ten were won, two drawn and two ended with a defeat. Only one of these test games were played at home in St. Jakob Stadium, the others were all played away.

Domestic league
The 1982–83 Nationalliga A was contested by 16 teams, including the top 14 clubs from the previous season and the two sides promoted from the second level 1981–82 Nationalliga B, these being FC Winterthur and FC Wettingen. The league was contested in a double round robin format, with each club playing every other club twice, home and away. Two points were awarded for a win and one point given to each team for a draw. Basel ended the season in eleventh position. In their 30 league games Basel won ten, drew five and lost fifteen matches, obtaining 25 points. They scored 47 goals, conceding 56, they were 24 points behind Grasshopper Club Zürich who became new champions. The new champions were qualified for 1983–84 European Cup. Servette were second in the championship, but as Cup winners they qualified for the 1983–84 Cup Winners' Cup. Therefore, the third and fourth teams, St. Gallen and Zürich, qualified for the 1983–84 UEFA Cup. FC Bulle and FC Winterthur suffered relegation.

Swiss Cup
Basel entered into the Swiss Cup in the round of 64. Here they were drawn away against FC Breitenbach and on 9 October they won the match 4–0. In the round of 32 Basel were drawn at home against Lausanne-Sport. The game was played on 12 March 1983 and Basel won 2–1. On 4 April the away defeat against Mendrisio meant the end of this cup season. The Swiss League Cup was not competed this year.

Coppa delle Alpi
In the Coppa delle Alpi Basel were drawn against AJ Auxerre and Metz. Two draws against Auxerre and one victory and a defeat against Metz left them in third position in the Swiss teams group table. Xamax and Nantes played in the final.

Players 
The following is the list of the Basel first team squad during the season 1982–83. The list includes players that were in the squad on the day that the Nationalliga A season started on 14 August 1982 but subsequently left the club after that date.

 
 

 
 
 
 
 

  

 
 
 

 
 
 
 
 
 
 

Players who left the squad

Results 
Legend

Friendly matches

Pre- and mid-season

Winter break and mid-season

Nationalliga A

League matches

League table

Swiss Cup

Coppa delle Alpi

Group A

NB: teams played two teams of the other country home and away

See also
 History of FC Basel
 List of FC Basel players
 List of FC Basel seasons

Sources and references
 Rotblau: Jahrbuch Saison 2015/2016. Publisher: FC Basel Marketing AG. 
 Switzerland 1982–83 at RSSSF
 Cup of the Alps 1982 at RSSSF

External links
 FC Basel official site

FC Basel seasons
Basel